Carolyne Marina Van Vliet,  van Vliet, (1929 – 2016) was a Dutch-American physicist notable for the theory of generation-recombination noise and for the theory of quantum transport in non-equilibrium statistical mechanics, as well as for her  many contributions to the foundations of Linear Response Theory. She was a Fellow of the American Physical Society (APS) and of the Institute of Electrical and Electronics Engineers (IEEE).

Education
Van Vliet obtained a BS in physics and mathematics from Vrije Universiteit, Amsterdam in 1949. Van Vliet then obtained an MA in physics from the same university in 1953, and a PhD in 1956 for a thesis titled Current Fluctuations in Semiconductors and Photoconductors, under Gerardus J. Sizoo.

Personal life
As a teenager, Van Vliet lived in the Nazi-occupied Netherlands for 5 years. The name change from "K M van Vliet" to "C M Van Vliet" occurred in 1982. She moved to Minneapolis, Minnesota in 1956, then to Montreal, Quebec in 1969. Starting in 1995 she lived in Miami, Florida.

Career
Van Vliet was a Teaching Assistant (1949–1953) at the Vrije Universiteit in Amsterdam, and then a NV Philips Research Fellow (1953–1956) at the same university. This was followed by an appointment as a Fulbright Fellow in the Electrical Engineering Department at the University of Minnesota (1956–1957), where she rose to assistant professor. During 1958-1960, Van Vliet was appointed as 'Conservator' in the Department of Physics at the Vrije Universiteit and then was appointed at the University of Minnesota (1957–1970) rising to professor. In that time, she was an Assistant (1957–58) and Associate (1960-65) Professor in the Department of Electrical Engineering and a Full professor (1965–70) in the Department of Physics. In 1969-1995, Van Vliet was Professor of Theoretical Physics at the Centre de Recherches Mathématiques of the Université de Montréal. Then, during 1992-2000, she was a professor at Florida International University in Miami. Her last position was as adjunct Professor of Physics at the University of Miami. In her career, she actively visited other physics departments over the years which include the University of Utrecht in the Netherlands (1968, 1977) and the University of Florida in Gainesville, FL (1974, 1977, 1978–84).

She was a stellar researcher and teacher who specialized in the areas of non-equilibrium statistical mechanics, fluctuations and stochastic processes, quantum transport in condensed matter and electron behavior in nanoscale quantum devices during her career. These topics are relevant today in exploring the development of quantum computing and its applications. She published over 200 scientific publications and several books included a graduate textbook, "Equilibrium and Non-Equilibruim Statistical Mechanics". She also supervised and graduated over 28 PhD students from 1958 to 2000.

Publications by Van Vliet
 K M van Vliet, Current Fluctuations in Semiconductors and Photoconductors, Ph.D. thesis, (copyrighted) Excelsior Press, The Hague, Netherlands, 1956.
 K M van Vliet, Elektronica, Collegedictaat, 1958 (copyright VU).
 K M van Vliet and J. R. Fassett " Fluctuations due to Electronic Transitions and Transport in Solids" in Fluctuation Phenomena in Solids (R.E. Burgess, Ed.), (copyright Academic Press) Academic Press, NY, 1965.
 Carolyne M. Van Vliet, "Ninth International Conference on Noise in Physical Systems" (Ed.), (copyright WSPC) World Scientific Publishing Company, Singapore 1987.
 Carolyne M. Van Vliet, Equilibrium and Non-equilibrium Statistical Mechanics, (copyright Carolyne M. Van Vliet) World Scientific Publishing Company, Singapore and New Jersey, 2008.

Notes

External links 
 Van Vliet bio
 Van Vliet's Fellow IEEE citation
 Van Vliet's scientific publications
 Van Vliet's academic genealogy

1929 births
2016 deaths
American electrical engineers
American women physicists
American textbook writers
Women textbook writers
Vliet, Carolyne M. van
20th-century Dutch physicists
Fellow Members of the IEEE
People from Dordrecht
People from Miami
Probability theorists
Vliet, Carolyne M. van
University of Miami faculty
University of Minnesota faculty
Dutch women physicists
Engineers from Florida
20th-century American women scientists
American women academics
21st-century American women scientists
Fellows of the American Physical Society
Women electrical engineers
20th-century American physicists
21st-century American physicists
20th-century American engineers
21st-century American engineers
20th-century Dutch engineers
20th-century Dutch women scientists
20th-century women engineers
21st-century women engineers
Dutch electrical engineers
Fulbright alumni